Jessica Kirkland (born November 10, 1987) is a former professional tennis player from the United States. Played on the WTA tour 2002-2009. Career high 151. In 2004, she was the Girls Singles Finalist at the U.S. Open in New York City, New York. Kirkland also won Wimbledon juniors mix doubles with Andy Murray. A highlight of her career was making the 4th round at Indian Wells in 2005. She dominated Marion Bartoli (FRA) 6-0, 6-1. She Had Numerous wins over players in the top 50 and top 25 in her career. In her career, Kirkland won a total of four ITF titles, of which three were in singles and one in doubles. As a junior, she was ranked #1 in the World (2005). Won The Girls 18’s Orange Bowl & Easter Bowl. USTA National Hardcourt Girls 18’s Champion. ITF Winter International Girl’s 18’s Champion 2004 (in the quarterfinals she defeated Caroline Wozniacki). ITF International Hard Courts Girl’s 18’s Champion. USTA Winter Nationals Champion Girls 14’s. USTA National Clay Courts Champion Girl’s 12’s. When she was 13 years old, she was the #1 ranked 18-year-old in the United States by the USTA. Kirkland was ranked #1 in the United States in the 12’s, 14’s, and 18’s (2000-2004). Kirkland went on the WTA Tour when she was 15 years old.

Biography
Kirkland's biggest career highlight was reaching the fourth round of the Tier I Pacific Life Open at Indian Wells in March 2005, beating number 22-seeded Marion Bartoli 6–0, 6–1 en route. Her biggest ITF title came when she won the singles of the $50,000 event at Carson, California in June 2007. 

Jessica retired from the WTA in July 2009. Last tournament was Atlanta, Georgia. Under went shoulder surgery after.

Junior Grand Slam finals

Girls' singles: 1 (1 runner–up)

ITF Circuit finals

Singles: 4 (3 title, 1 runner–ups)

Doubles: 2 (1 title, 1 runner-up)

Performance timelines

Only main-draw results in WTA Tour, Grand Slam tournaments, Billie Jean King Cup and Olympic Games are included in win–loss records.

Singles
Current after the 2021 Western & Southern Open.

References

External links
 
 

Living people
1987 births
American female tennis players
Tennis players from Miami
Sportspeople from Dayton, Ohio
Tennis people from Ohio
21st-century American women